Trio Rio was a German quintet from Cologne.

History
The band was founded in 1983 by vocalist Peter Fessler (born 1959) together with four friends. They are best known for their hit song "New York - Rio - Tokyo" which reached number three on the German chart in 1986. The follow-up single, "Voulez Voulez Vous" did not manage to chart. The band separated in 1987.

Peter Fessler returned in 1993 with "Conquer Me", a solo hit. From there he switched to playing jazz with Randy Crawford and Chaka Khan. Klaus Mages later joined the Rainbirds. Oliver Heuss went on to compose film scores and ad jingles.

Discography

Albums
1986 - Trio Rio (#23 Germany)
1987 - Voodoo Nights
1990 - Who Dat, Mon?

Singles
1986 - "I'm Still In Love With You"
1986 - "New York - Rio - Tokyo" (#3 Germany – 14 weeks on the chart)
1987 - "Voulez Voulez Vous"
1987 - "Greatest Love"
1990 - "Who Dat, Mon?"

German dance music groups
Musical groups established in 1983
Musical groups disestablished in 1987
Musical groups from Cologne